The Tryhoop Okayama is a professional basketball team that  competes in the third division of the Japanese B.League. They began play in the 2019-2020 season. Their main home court is Zip Arena in Okayama City.

Coaches
Yoichi Motoyasu
Satoshi Toyao
Kenji Hilke

Roster

Notable players

Kenji Hilke
Chukwudiebere Maduabum
Jeff Parmer
Nigel Spikes
DeVaughn Washington

Arenas
Zip Arena Okayama
Kasaoka General Gymnasium
Okayama Gakugeikan High School
Mitsu Sports Park
Mimasaka Arena
Tsuyama General Gymnasium

References

External links

 
Basketball teams in Japan
Sports teams in Okayama Prefecture
Basketball teams established in 2018
2018 establishments in Japan